Sema K. Sgaier is a scientist, global health expert, and documentary photographer. Sgaier’s expertise includes molecular biology, genetics, genomics, neuroscience, epidemiology, disease surveillance, monitoring & evaluation of programs and policy development.

Sema is an assistant adjunct professor at the Harvard T.H. Chan School of Public Health and an affiliate assistant professor of global health at the University of Washington.

Research
Sgaier was the first to fine tune and apply the technique of Genetic Inducible Fate Mapping (GIFM) to understand how the complex 3D cerebellum develops from early-undifferentiated neuronal cells of the anterior hindbrain. With Tim Yu and colleagues, she discovered that mutations in the gene WDR62 causes microcephaly.

At the Center for Global Health Research, Sgaier designed and developed the Sample Registration Health Check-Up Survey to study the underlying risk factors of various diseases in India. She has published on the epidemiology of HIV and sexually transmitted diseases.

From 2008, Sema was a Program Officer with the Bill & Melinda Gates Foundation. She led a portfolio on voluntary medical male circumcision for HIV prevention across eastern and southern Africa. As part of BMGF’s India Country Office, Sema led the scale-up of the foundation’s HIV prevention program (Avahan) in several states, managed its transition to the government of India, and developed data platforms for decision-making. She worked closely with the Indian National AIDS Control Program to assist in the design of their program and strengthen their analytic efforts.

Early life
Sgaier was born in 1975 in Tripoli, Libya to a Libyan father and Turkish mother. Sgaier studied Molecular Biology and Genetics at Boğaziçi University (Istanbul, Turkey) where she graduated with her Bachelor of Science in 2005, ranking first of her class. Sgaier later obtained her Masters in Art in Neuroscience from Brown University in 1999 and Masters in Science and Doctorate of Philosophy (PhD) in Cellular and Molecular Biology (Developmental Genetics) in 2005 from New York University. She conducted her Postdoctoral training in Human Genomics in the Lab of Dr. Christopher A. Walsh at Beth Israel Deaconess Medical Center, Harvard Medical School.

Sema is the recipient of New York University, Brown University fellowships and Beth Israel Deaconess Medical Center fellowships.

Sgaier studied Documentary Photography at the International Center of Photography.

List of works

Research articles

Book chapters
 Ramakrishnan, A., Sgaier, S.K., Alexander, A. Scaling HIV Prevention through Partnerships – The Avahan Experience in India. Innovative Health Partnerships- The Diplomacy of Diversity. World Scientific Pub Co Inc, 2011.
 Sgaier, S.K. Berenshteyn, F., Joyner, A.L., Miller, S., Song, C. Villanueva, M.P.  The Concept of Fate Through the Lens of Genetics, in Beesley, P., S. Hirosue, J. Ruxton, M. Tränkle, C. Turner Eds. Responsive Architectures: Subtle Technologies. Riverside Architectural Press, Cambridge, 2006 pp. 26–29

Articles

 Stanford Social Innovation Review: Time to Scale Psycho-Behavioral Segmentation in Global Development. Fall 2018.
 Stanford Social Innovation Review: Design Thinking Without Deep Data Will Fail Our Customers in Global Health. Feb. 14, 2019. 
 Project Syndicate: Why So Many Newborns and Mothers Still Die. Jun 17, 2019. 
 Stanford Social Innovation Review: Demystifying Machine Learning for Global Development. Jul. 24, 2019. 
 Harvard Business Review: Using AI to Understand What Causes Diseases. November 8, 2019

References

Boğaziçi University alumni
1975 births
Libyan people of Turkish descent
People from Tripoli, Libya
Molecular biologists
Brown University alumni
New York University alumni
Harvard Medical School alumni
Women photographers
Living people
Libyan scientists